This list of books about Go is for books about the board game Go.

Books in English

0

A

Kido Classics, Amazing Happenings in the Game of Go, Vols. 1-3

B

C

D
Dictionary of Basic Fuseki, Vols. 1-3
 [Ni-ren-sei (Two Star Points) and San-ren-sei (Three Star Points) Patterns]
 [Star Point and 3-4 Point Combinations]
 [5-4, 4-4 and 3-3 point josekis]
 [3-4 Point Openings]
Dictionary of Basic Tesuji, Vols. 1-4

E
Elementary Go, Vols. 1-7

F

G
Get Strong at Go, Vols. 1-10

H

I
Improve Your Intuition, Vols. 1-3

K

L
Learn to Play Go, Vols. 1-5

M

Mastering the Basics, Vols. 1-5

Modern Joseki and Fuseki, Vols. 1-2

N

P

S

T

V

W
Whole Board Thinking in Joseki, Vols. 1-2

Y
Yilun Yang's Go Puzzles, Vols. 1-2

Yilun Yang's Ingenous Life and Death Puzzles, Vols. 1-2

Books in Chinese
Memoirs of a Floating Life, Vols. 1-3

 (Shen Chun-shan Tells the Stories of Kings of Go), Vols. 1-5

Books in Japanese

Tesuji Dictionary, Vols. 1-3

Books in Other Languages

Fiction

References

Go
 
Books
Go